Luis María Pérez de Onraita Aguirre (12 April 1933 – 3 April 2015) was a Spanish Roman Catholic bishop who served in Angola.

He was born in Gauna, Álava, Spain and ordained a priest in 1957. He was named the coadjutor bishop of Malanje, Angola in 1996 and retired in 2012 as archbishop.

References

External links
Luis María Pérez de Onraita Aguirre-Catholic Hierarchy

People from Álava
Spanish expatriates in Angola
Spanish Roman Catholic bishops
1933 births
2015 deaths
Roman Catholic archbishops of Malanje